Auchenreoch, or Auchinreoch is a small hamlet formerly in Stirlingshire but now in East Dunbartonshire, Scotland near Kilsyth and Kirkintilloch.

A sparsely populated farming community, within the hamlet is Auchinreoch Stables. The stable was the home of famous Grand National winner Red Rum from the horses retirement from racing in 1978 until his death in 1995.

Hamlets in East Dunbartonshire